Paul Stokell (born 8 March 1968 in Tasmania) is an Australian racing driver. Highly decorated in every category he has competed, Stokell has been a race and multiple championship winning driver in open wheel, sportscar racing and tarmac rallying, consistently since the early 1990s and remains so today having won back to back Australian Targa Championship in 2018/2019.

While Tasmanian born, today Stokell is Queensland based where he has operated a performance driving school since 2008, and has been involved with the Sherrin Motor Sport Porsche Carrera Cup team taking their maiden victory in 2007.

Open wheelers
Stokell first emerged into the national spotlight racing in the national Australian Formula Ford series, taking a Reynard to runner up in the 1990 title behind Russell Ingall. Stokell tried to push his career in England in the next couple of years however a lack of support forced his return to Australian racing in 1993 driving for Malcolm Ramsay's South Australian Birrana Racing team in Formula Brabham (which reverted to its original name of Formula Holden in 1996). With Stokell leading, Birrana came to dominate the category and Stokell took a trifecta of Australian Drivers' Championships in the mid-90s. In 1994, he represented Australia in the EFDA Nations Cup but the highlight of the era was his first international victory, winning the 1994 New Zealand International Series and 1995 Pan Pacific title including the Malaysian Grand Prix.

Sports cars
In 1998, Stokell led an importer supported team driving Lotus Elise in the Australian GT Production Car Championship and against larger and more powerful cars Stokell became a giant-killer in the Lotus, finishing sixth in the championship. Out of this effort came an invitation to join the newly formed Team Lamborghini Australia, to race Lamborghini Diablos in the Australian Nations Cup Championship. Starting in 2000, Stokell was a constant front runner in the black Diablo and again became a championship winner in 2003 and 2004. In 2005, he drove in one round of the FIA GT Championship in a Lotus placing second in the G2 class.

Since then Stokell has made sporadic appearances in a variety of categories and became a competitor and entrant in the new Mini Challenge series in 2008 and became series champion in 2009. He followed that by representing Australia for the second time in the Spanish Mini Challenge in 2010 as well as finishing second in the Australian Mini Challenge in 2010.

Career results
Some results sources from:

 † Team result

Complete V8 Supercar results

Complete Bathurst 24 Hour results

Complete Bathurst 12 Hour results

References

External links

Speedsport Profile
V8 Supercar Results

1968 births
EFDA Nations Cup drivers
Formula Ford drivers
Formula Holden drivers
Living people
Racing drivers from Tasmania
Supercars Championship drivers
Australian Endurance Championship drivers
Dick Johnson Racing drivers